Big Brother 24 is the twenty-fourth season of the American reality television program Big Brother. The season premiered on July 6, 2022, on CBS in the United States and Global in Canada.

The season ran for 82 days, with the season ending on September 25, 2022, when Taylor Hale was crowned the winner, defeating Monte Taylor. Hale became the first black female HouseGuest to win, as well as the second black HouseGuest to win in the main edition of the show.  She was also voted America's Favorite HouseGuest, becoming the first winner to also claim this prize. On September 25, 2022, CBS renewed the series for a twenty-fifth season.

Format 
Big Brother follows a group of contestants, known as HouseGuests, who live inside a custom-built house outfitted with cameras and microphones recording their every move 24 hours a day. The HouseGuests are sequestered with no contact with the outside world. During their stay, the HouseGuests share their thoughts on their day-to-day lives inside the house in a private room known as the Diary Room. Each week, the HouseGuests compete in competitions in order to win power and safety inside the house. At the start of each week, the HouseGuests compete in a Head of Household (abbreviated as "HOH") competition. The winner of the HoH competition is immune from eviction and  selects two HouseGuests to be nominated for eviction. Six HouseGuests are then selected to compete in the Power of Veto (abbreviated as "PoV") competition: the reigning HoH, the nominees, and three other HouseGuests chosen by random draw. The winner of the PoV competition has the right to either revoke the nomination of one of the nominated HouseGuests or leave them as is. If the veto winner uses this power, the HoH must immediately nominate another HouseGuest for eviction. The PoV winner is also immune from being named as the replacement nominee. On eviction night, all HouseGuests vote to evict one of the nominees, though the Head of Household and the nominees are not allowed to vote. This vote is conducted in the privacy of the Diary Room. In the event of a tie, the Head of Household casts the tie-breaking vote. The nominee with the most votes is evicted from the house. The last nine evicted HouseGuests comprise the Jury and are sequestered in a separate location following their eviction and ultimately decide the winner of the season. The Jury is only allowed to see the competitions and ceremonies that include all of the remaining HouseGuests; they are not shown any interviews or other footage that might include strategy or details regarding nominations. The viewing public is able to award an additional prize by choosing "America's Favorite HouseGuest." All evicted HouseGuests are eligible to win this award except for those who either voluntarily leave or are forcibly removed for rule violations.

HouseGuests 

The HouseGuests for the twenty-fourth season were revealed on July 5, 2022. US Weekly published a series of cast interviews on the same day. Prior to the reveal, CBS aired a teaser featuring various voice clips from the HouseGuests. The cast includes Miss Michigan USA 2021 and Miss USA 2021 competitor Taylor Hale. Marvin Achi, a 28-year-old from Houston, Texas, was among the sixteen HouseGuests initially slated to be on the season, but was removed from the cast and replaced by Joseph Abdin. The speculated reason for his removal resulted from his participation on the Netflix reality series, The Circle which filmed in the Fall of 2021 and aired in late 2022.

Episodes 
Note

Twists

Backstage Boss 
On Night 1, one HouseGuest randomly selected the Backstage Boss Pass. This player would be granted immunity for the week, but could not be nominated, lost eligibility to participate in the week's competitions, and could not vote on eviction night. This player also had to choose three other HouseGuests to join them Backstage. These HouseGuests would also be safe from nomination, lost eligibility to participate in the week's competitions, and could not vote on eviction night. However, the three Backstage HouseGuests were not granted immunity and would still be eligible for eviction. On eviction night, the HouseGuest evicted by the house would have gone in a head-to-head battle against one of the Backstage HouseGuests. An online public vote was held for America to grant one of the three Backstage HouseGuests immunity from eviction for the week. The loser of the competition between the house evictee and the selected Backstage HouseGuest would immediately become evicted.

Pooch ended up claiming the Backstage Boss Pass and as a result was required to select three HouseGuests to join him Backstage. Pooch selected Alyssa, Brittany, and Paloma to join him. Brittany won the majority of the public vote and would have been granted immunity for the week had the twist not been cancelled. Since Paloma chose to leave the game, the twist was cancelled.

Festie Besties 
Starting in Week 3, the HouseGuests competed in sets, similarly to the Duos Twist in season 13. The HouseGuest who was named Head of Household earned immunity for their Besties, and was obligated to nominate another set of Besties for eviction. Three sets of Besties would compete for the Power of Veto: the HOH's set, the nominated set, and another set selected by random draw. Only one person from the winning set needed to decide to use the Power of Veto in order to save the nominated set of Besties. Should that happen, the entire set of Besties would be saved, forcing the HoH to nominate another set as replacements. After each eviction, the surviving Bestie chose a new set of Besties to join. The sets are listed below.

Split House Double Eviction 
Following Week 6's eviction, the house was split into two groups of five that had no interaction for the entire week. The winner of the HOH competition became the HOH for Big BroChella, occurring in the house, while the second place finisher became HOH of Dyre Fest, occurring outside. The remaining houseguests were split via a school yard pick by the respective HOHs. A full week of events played out for each group, with their own competitions, nominations, and evictions. Ultimately, two HouseGuests were evicted at the end of Week 7. The groups are listed below:

Voting history 

Notes

 :  For drawing the Backstage Boss ticket on Day 1, Pooch was sent "backstage" and was granted immunity for the entire week. As a result, he could not be nominated, was ineligible to compete in the week's competitions, and was ineligible to vote on eviction night.
 :  Three HouseGuests were selected by Pooch to be sent "backstage": Alyssa, Brittany, and Paloma. They also could not be nominated, lost their eligibility to compete in the week's competitions, and were ineligible to vote on eviction night. Had the eviction gone ahead as planned, the house would have voted for one of the nominees to face off against one of the backstage HouseGuests in a challenge, with the loser being evicted from the house. It was announced that Brittany had won the online public vote against Alyssa and Paloma, which would have granted her immunity from eviction.
 : Paloma left the game on Day 8. Since she was one of the Backstage Houseguests eligible for eviction, the eviction planned for Day 9 was cancelled.
 : From Weeks 3 to 5, the HouseGuests played in sets known as Festie Besties. Besties were nominated together and should the veto be used, the set would be removed from the block and be replaced by another set of Besties. On eviction night, the HouseGuest who survived eviction chose another set of Besties to join.
 :  This HouseGuest's Bestie won HoH, granting them immunity for the week.
 : Following Indy's eviction, the house was split into two groups of five that had no interaction for the entire week. One group, Big BroChella, lived inside the house for the week, while the other, Dyre Fest, lived outside in the backyard. A full week of events played out for each group, with their own competitions, nominations, and evictions.
: This week was a double eviction week. Following the first eviction, the remaining HouseGuests played a week's worth of games, including HoH and Veto competitions, and nomination, veto and eviction ceremonies, during the live show, culminating in a second eviction for the week.
: As the house's vote was tied, the Head of Household cast the tie-breaker vote.
: As Head of Household, Monte chose to evict Turner.
: During the finale, the Jury voted for the winner of Big Brother.

Production

Development 
 
Big Brother 24 is co-produced by production companies Endemol Shine North America and Fly On The Wall Entertainment. The season was first confirmed following the conclusion of the previous season in a joint announcement that also confirmed that Celebrity Big Brother would be revived for a third season.  Host Julie Chen Moonves returned for the season along with Allison Grodner and Rich Meehan who serve as executive producers. Casting for the season started in February 2022 and concluded sometime around June 2022. As has been the case since Big Brother 22, open-call auditions were not held for this season. Jesse Tannenbaum returned to head the casting efforts for Big Brother 24.

On June 1, 2022, CBS announced that the season would premiere on July 6, 2022, with confirmation on June 15, 2022, of a 90-minute live premiere. Prior to the season premiere, it was widely speculated that live audiences would return in a full capacity following two seasons of absence due to previous pandemic restrictions. While the premiere and first five evictions took place behind closed doors, a live audience returned for the remainder of the season, starting with the live eviction on August 18, 2022. Key art for the season was released on June 15, 2022.

Prize 
The winner of the series, determined by the previously evicted HouseGuests, wins  while the runner-up receives . The HouseGuest selected as America's Favorite HouseGuest receives .

Production design 

The house is located at the Radford Studio Center in Los Angeles, California. As with previous seasons, the house is outfitted with 94 HD cameras and more than 113 microphones. Photos and a video tour of the house were released by CBS on July 5, 2022. Alternatively known as the "BB Motel", Julie Chen Mooves described the house's theme as a "colorful, desert oasis inspired by Palm Springs, and a blast from the past, mid-century style." A golf-themed bedroom has mini golf cart models lined along the walls, with the beds with headboards composed of AstroTurf. A second bedroom is decorated with details alluding to the car designs of the 1950s, including portraits of the car designs and beds with headboards composing of vintage car dashboards. The Space Age-themed bedroom features hanging models of Venus, Earth and Saturn. The Have-Not room resembles a drained pool, with a slide and inflatables being placed on the room.

Reception

Controversies

Mistreatment of Taylor Hale 
Following the launch of the show's live feeds, a majority of the HouseGuests received criticism for their behavior towards Taylor Hale. Viewers noted multiple lies made about Hale, along with several comments that displayed racially charged microaggressions, acts of colorism, conscious bias, and unconscious assumptions regarding Hale's appearance and personality.

Julie Chen Moonves weighed in. "Microaggressions are real and they happen. I don't think most people, when they are committing it, that they are even aware of what they're doing. I think that with the live feeds it is easy," Chen said. "I think what we need to do is ask ourselves, 'Who am I — who is anyone — to judge somebody else?'". She also addressed those that were critical of the HouseGuests on social media: "It's so interesting that you use the term 'mob mentality.' Because isn't that what Twitter has done? Aren't you all being hypocrites? There has been this mob mentality created against people in the house, who viewers feel have not been kind to Taylor. I think anytime you're nominated, it'll bring you to tears... It hurts. It hurts and I have sympathy for her. I have sympathy for everyone in that house. It's not easy".

Daniel Durston's outburst and disparaging comments towards Taylor Hale were heavily criticized by the viewer audience. Featured on episode 9, Durston verbally attacked Hale in defense of Nicole Layog, who misinterpreted Hale's support of her emotional breakdown as a hint to quit the game. After Layog vented about the situation to the other HouseGuests, Durston confronted a confused Hale and accused her of causing HouseGuest Paloma Aguilar's exit from the show. Blaming Hale for Aguilar's mental health, Durston tells Hale, "You can f*** right off" and not to talk to him until the show's live finale. The confrontation brought Hale to tears with no one to publicly defend her. Prior to his outburst, Durston was also criticized for claiming, according to the live feeds, that Taylor isn't a good person and she "doesn't deserve to live normal." After his eviction during Week 5, Durston addressed his treatment of Hale in an interview with Entertainment Weekly. "Leaving the house, obviously it sits terrible with me. That's not how I want to be portrayed," Durston said. He also claimed that he would watch the show back to "correct [his] wrongs."

Kyle Capener's racial optics 
Viewers criticized Kyle Capener for attempting to create a racial divide among the contestants. During Week 4's live footage, Capener expressed fear in a potential alliance developing between the minorities in the house, labeling them as "Cookout 2.0.", referring to Big Brother 23s all-black six-person alliance.

Julie Chen Moonves addressed Capener's comments, deeming them as "game paranoia". She states, "You also have to remember, [Hale] told her whole alliance she would not nominate [Davis] because she refuses to part of evicting another Black woman. That might have steered [Capener]'s mind into thinking what if there is a secret alliance like the Cookout this season. Beyond that, I don't think there's much more to it."

Viewing figures

References

External links 
  – official American site
  – official Canadian site
 

2022 American television seasons
24